Brimpaen is a small town situated in the Wimmera region of western Victoria, Australia. The Henty Highway between Mildura and Portland passes through the town. At the 2021 census, Brimpaen and the surrounding area had a population of 80.

Brimpaen Post Office opened on 1 May 1886 and closed in September 1957.

References

External links

Towns in Victoria (Australia)
Rural City of Horsham